The Kodak Vigilant and Monitor cameras were popular folding bellows cameras made from 1939 to 1949. They featured an optical viewfinder without a rangefinder, adjustable focus lenses, and various models of shutters with speed up to 1/200 sec. Lenses available were a F/4.5 105mm, F/6.3 105mm and a F/8.8 100mm. They take 620 film, and produce a 2 1/4" x 3 1/4" inch medium format negative. The cameras can produce very sharp photos if used on a tripod and the manual distance setting on the lens is correct.

References 

Discovering Cameras 1945-1965, Robert White, Osprey Publishing, 1995

External links 
https://web.archive.org/web/20071114170655/http://www.kodak.com/global/en/consumer/products/techInfo/aa13/aa13pg2.shtml

Kodak cameras